Eva Háková (born 8 July 1969) is a Czech biathlete. She competed at the 1994, 1998 and the 2002 Winter Olympics.

References

1969 births
Living people
Biathletes at the 1994 Winter Olympics
Biathletes at the 1998 Winter Olympics
Biathletes at the 2002 Winter Olympics
Czech female biathletes
Olympic biathletes of the Czech Republic
Sportspeople from Karlovy Vary